Yana Muqu (Quechua yana black, muqu hill, "black hill", also spelled Yana Mokho) is a  mountain in the Bolivian Andes. It is located in the Chuquisaca Department, Azurduy Province, Tarvita Municipality.

References 

Mountains of Chuquisaca Department